Frederick or Fred Pearson may refer to:

Frederick Pearson (cricketer) (1880–1963), English cricketer
Frederick Pearson (U.S. Navy officer) (1842–1890), commander of Alaska, USA, in 1882
Frederick Stark Pearson (1861–1915), American engineer and entrepreneur
Frederick M. Pearson (1827–1876), Canadian businessman and politician
Fred Pearson (ice hockey) (1923–2009), American ice hockey player
Fred Pearson (actor), British actor

See also
Frederick Pearson Treadwell (1857–1918), American chemist